The Harriet Tubman Memorial, also known as Swing Low, located in Manhattan in New York City, honors the life of abolitionist Harriet Tubman. The intersection at which it stands was previously a barren traffic island, and is now known as "Harriet Tubman Triangle". As part of its redevelopment, the traffic island was landscaped with plants native to New York and to Tubman's home state of Maryland, representing the land which she and her Underground Railroad passengers travelled across.

The memorial was commissioned through the Department of Cultural Affairs Percent for Art program, and the development was managed by a multi-agency group consisting of representatives of the Parks and Recreation Commission, Department of Cultural Affairs, Department of Design and Construction and Department of Transportation. 

The memorial is a  bronze and Chinese granite portrait sculpture, and was created by sculptor Alison Saar. It was unveiled on November 13, 2008. Among those present at the unveiling ceremony were Parks and Recreation Commissioner Adrian Benepe, former Manhattan Borough President C. Virginia Fields, Schomburg Center for Research in Black Culture curator Christopher Moore, and Congressman Charles Rangel.

The statue depicts Tubman striding forward despite roots pulling on the back of her skirt; these represent the roots of slavery. Her skirt is decorated with images representing the former slaves who Tubman assisted to escape. The base of the statue features illustrations representing moments from Tubman's life, alternated with traditional quilting symbols.

In 2004, the traffic island and the statue received a Public Design Commission Award for Excellence in Design.

References
 

Memorials to Harriet Tubman
Monuments and memorials in Manhattan
Monuments and memorials to victims of slavery in the United States
Outdoor sculptures in Manhattan
Tubman
Sculptures of women in New York City
Statues in New York City
2007 establishments in New York City